is a Japanese writer of light novels, novels and manga.

Biography
Takemiya debuted in September 2004 with her light novel series Watashitachi no Tamura-kun (Our Tamura-kun) which first appeared in the autumn 2004 issue of Dengeki hp Special, a special edition version of Dengeki hp. That same month, Takemiya worked on the scenario for the bishōjo game Noel by FlyingShine (also known for creating Cross Channel). Following the completion of Watashitachi no Tamura-kun, Takemiya began her best-known series, Toradora!, which she declared to be complete in April 2010 after ten volumes and three spin-off books.  The first book of her next series, Golden Time, was Dengeki Bunko's 2000th published light novel. Takemiya launched the manga series Evergreen with artist Akira Caskabe on July 19, 2011 in ASCII Media Works' Dengeki Daioh Genesis quarterly magazine.

Works 
Light novels
 (under Dengeki Bunko, illustration by Yasu)
Watashitachi no Tamura-kun  (June 2005)
Watashitachi no Tamura-kun 2  (September 2005)
 (under Dengeki Bunko, illustration by Yasu)
Toradora!  (March 10, 2006)
Toradora2!  (May 10, 2006)
Toradora3!  (September 10, 2006)
Toradora4!  (January 10, 2007)
Toradora Spinoff! Koufuku no Sakura-iro Tornado  (May 10, 2007)
Toradora5!  (August 10, 2007)
Toradora6!  (December 10, 2007)
Toradora7!  (April 10, 2008)
Toradora8!  (August 10, 2008)
Toradora9!  (October 10, 2008)
Toradora Spinoff 2! Tora, Koyuru Aki  (January 7, 2009)
Toradora10!  (March 10, 2009)
Toradora Spinoff 3! Ore no Bentou Mite Kure  (April 10, 2010)
 (under Dengeki Bunko, illustration by Ēji Komatsu)
  (September 10, 2010)
  (March 10, 2011)
  (August 10, 2011)
  (March 10, 2012)
  (June 10, 2012)
  (September 10, 2012)
  (January 10, 2013)
  (April 10, 2013)
 , August 10, 2013 
 , October 10, 2013
  March 10, 2014
 (under Shincho Bunko, illustrations by Haruaki Fuyuno)  September 2014

Novels
  May 28, 2016 (Publisher Shinchousha)
  Nov 10, 2016 (Publisher Bungeishunjuu)
  May 27, 2017 (Publisher Shinchousha)
  Nov 9, 2017 (Publisher Bungeishunjuu)
  Oct 10, 2018 (Publisher Shinchosha)
  Feb 14, 2020 (Publisher KADOKAWA)
  March 27, 2021 (Publisher Shinchosha)

Manga
Watashitachi no Tamura-kun (with artist Sachi Kurafuji)
Toradora! (with artist Zekkyō)
Golden Time (with artist Umechazuke)
Evergreen (with artist Akira Kasukabe)

Games
Noel (FlyingShine) (September 24, 2004)

References 

1978 births
Living people
Japanese women novelists
Light novelists
Female comics writers
21st-century Japanese women writers